The Kunming–Mohan Expressway, commonly referred to as the Kunmo Expressway is an expressway that connects Kunming, Yunnan, China, and Mohan, a town on the border with Laos, in Xishuangbanna Dai Autonomous Prefecture, Yunnan. The expressway is a spur of G85 Chongqing–Kunming Expressway and is entirely in Yunnan Province.

The Kunming–Mohan Expressway forms the Chinese portion of the Kunming–Bangkok Expressway, to Bangkok, Thailand. Mohan, the southern terminus, is on the China–Laos border and there is a border checkpoint which connects to Route 13 and later to Vientiane–Boten Expressway in Laos. It was completed in 2017.

China National Highway 213 parallels much of this route but is not an expressway.

References

Chinese national-level expressways
Expressways in Yunnan